Warren Livingston (born July 5, 1938) is a former professional American football cornerback in the National Football League for the Dallas Cowboys. He played college football at the University of Arizona.

Early years
Livingston attended Mesa High School where he first began to play football and was a two-way player. He was named to the All-state team at halfback in his last 2 years. In track, he set the school long jump record and was a 3-time state champion.

He accepted a scholarship from the University of Arizona, where he became a three-year starter. He was a two-way player and a versatile athlete, that in games was used as a running back, cornerback and wide receiver.

In 1959, he received All-Border Conference honors after averaging 6.7 yards per carry and leading his team in rushing with 380 yards, while his teammate Walt Mince had a 6.1-yard average.

In 1960, although he was more focused on defense, he set a school record with an 80-yard punt return against the University of Colorado Boulder. He also had one of his best games against the three touchdown favored Arizona State University team, that was looking to win a fifth Territorial Cup in a row. In the game, he had a 60-yard touchdown in a 35-7 upset.

Livingston also was a part of the track and field team, where he competed in the long jump, high jump and sprints. His 24 feet long jump in 1960, made him the third best jumper in school history. He highjumped 6-1. He won several scholastic honors while studying engineering.

In 1991, he was inducted into the University of Arizona Sports Hall of Fame.

Professional career
Livingston was signed as an undrafted free agent by the Dallas Cowboys, after not being selected in the 1961 NFL draft. He was moved to cornerback and became a starter as a rookie, until suffering a serious fracture on his left arm against the St. Louis Cardinals and being placed on the injured reserve list on November 6. He was named to the NFL All-rookie team at the end of the year.

In 1962, he missed most of the pre-season with another injury to the same arm, which limited him to play in only 3 games during the regular season. The next year, he was named the starter at free safety, because he was considered a great open field tackler.

In 1964, he was moved back to cornerback and although he was waived on September 3, he was later re-signed and did not miss any games, splitting time (7 starts) with Don Bishop at right cornerback. The next two years he was the regular starter at right cornerback.

Livingston experienced a difficult 1966 NFL Championship Game against the Green Bay Packers, where he was targeted on key third down plays that would impact the final result. He was released on September 5, 1967, after being passed on the depth chart by Mike Johnson.

Personal life
After football, he received a master's degree in electrical engineering from the University of Arizona and worked for Motorola until his retirement in 1994.

His brother Andy Livingston was a running back in the NFL for the Chicago Bears and the New Orleans Saints.

References

External links
 University of Arizona Athletics Hall of Fame bio
 Arizona Daily Star: Brother duo combined to play 12 seasons in NFL

1938 births
Living people
Sportspeople from Mesa, Arizona
Players of American football from Arizona
American football cornerbacks
Arizona Wildcats football players
Dallas Cowboys players
Mesa High School alumni